Lechia Gdańsk Ladies, formerly known as Biało-Zielone Gdańsk, is the ladies football team for Lechia Gdańsk.

History

The team were created in 2016 as Biało-Zielone Gdańsk and focused on football training for girls in youth teams. Biało-Zielone Gdańsk was closely linked with Lechia Gdańsk in its early years. After Lechia and AP Lotos Gdańsk, then known as Akademia Piłkarska Lechia Gdańsk, started having differences in how the academy should be run, the Biało-Zielone team allowed Lechia to have its own ladies team that was not associated with the team that Lechia and AP Lotos Gdańsk, with funding from Grupa Lotos, had created together in 2015. Biało-Zielone were created with the agreement that the team would eventually become part of the Lechia Gdańsk structure, and signed a long-term plan of being officially associated with Lechia Gdańsk in 2016. During the three years the club was known as Biało-Zielone Gdańsk the club won promotion to the II liga in their first season, and spent the following two seasons in the II liga.

It was announced in June 2019 that the "Biało-Zielone Gdańsk" team was to be officially incorporated into the Lechia Gdańsk Academy, leading to an official Lechia Gdańsk Ladies team, as well as girls teams for various age groups throughout the academy set-up. Due to the official affiliation with Lechia, the Ladies team would see increased funds for all footballing activities, as well as the use of better facilities, leading to the team to become more professional as a result. This incorporation would also see the team taking the Lechia Gdańsk name, changing from "Biało-Zielone Gdańsk" to "Lechia Gdańsk Kobiet".

The end of the 2018–19 season saw the full incorporation of the Lechia Gdańsk Ladies into the Lechia academy. This resulted in the newly created Lechia Gdańsk Ladies playing in the III liga for the 2019–20 season, due to Biało-Zielone's relegation in their final season.

Club names

Biało-Zielone Gdańsk (2016–2019)
KS Lechia Gdańsk Kobiet SA (2019–)

Honours

III liga

Runners-up (1): 2016–17
Third place (1): 2021–22

Notes

Seasons

† Season ongoing

Notes

Stats

League top goalscorers

References

Lechia Gdańsk
Football teams
Women's football clubs in Poland
Sport in Gdańsk
Football clubs in Pomeranian Voivodeship
2019 establishments in Poland
Association football clubs established in 2019